Neheb is mentioned in the Palermo Stone as a Predynastic Egyptian king who ruled in Lower Egypt. As there is no other evidence of such a ruler, he may be a mythical king preserved through oral tradition, or may even be completely fictitious.

References

People whose existence is disputed
Pharaohs only mentioned in the Palermo Stone
Year of birth unknown
Year of death unknown